Holly Golightly (born September 1, 1964) is a comics artist and writer. She was formerly known as Fauve and has also worked under the name Holly G!

Biography

Holly Golightly entered the comics industry in the 1990s under the pen name Fauve, doing work for the Carnal Comics title True Stories of Adult Film Stars, including three issues on Sarah-Jane Hamilton (one of which sported her first published cover illustration) and stories featuring Julia Ann, Janine Lindemulder, and Lilli Xene. She names artist Frank Thorne as her "hero" for his work on Red Sonja. Golightly's list of work ranges from Nightmare Theatre for Chaos! Comics to Sabrina for Archie Comics to her creator-owned work such as Vampfire and School Bites.

She is the colorist for husband Jim Balent's Tarot: Witch of the Black Rose as well as the model for Tarot herself. She has frequently been shown on the photo covers dressed as Tarot and as Catress from the 3 Little Kittens comics and is the model for the official Tarot photo calendar.

She has expanded into pin-ups/modeling with Balent doing the photography and has her own pin-up calendar. She designed and maintains both of their official websites, and designs many of the T-shirts and apparel that the site offers.

Golightly also contributes art for various businesses and people including NewWitch magazine and Thomas Dolby.

Golightly and Balent operate the BroadSword Comics comics publishing company, known for its Tarot: Witch of the Black Rose comic book. Under this company, Golightly has published Fears and Ears: A Travel Guide to Orlando as well as numerous art books of her own work. Golightly frequently draws one-page stories featuring her cat, Pangur Ban. A collection of these stories was published through Kickstarter in 2015.

Bibliography

Archie Comics
 
 Archie & Friends #52–56, 58, 60, 62–63 (2001–2002)
 Archie's Holiday Fun Digest #3 (1999)
 Archie's Pal Jughead Comics #139 (2001)
 Betty #99 (one page) (2001)
 Betty and Veronica #130, 134, 159 (1998–2001)
 Cheryl Blossom #21, 30, 33, 37 (1999–2001)
 Jughead's Double Digest #57 (1999)
 Sabrina #32–33, 35–37 (2002)
 Sabrina the Teenage Witch #38–58 (2003–2004)

Blackout Comics
 Bad Girls of Blackout Annual #1 (1995)

Brainstorm Comics
 Bethany the Vampfire #0 (1997)
 Vamperotica #8, Annual #1 (1995)
 Vampfire #1 (1996)
 Vampfire Tour Book #1 (1997)

BroadSword Comics
 3 Little Kittens: Purrr-fect Weapons #1–3 (2002)
 School Bites (2004)
 Prince Pangur Ban the Fluffy: Mother of Fluffins the Collected Series (2015)
 Tarot: Witch of the Black Rose #1–122 (colorist and letterer) (2000–present)
 VampFire #3 (2001)

Chaos! Comics
 Nightmare Theater #1–4 (1997)

London Night Studios
 Razor: Swimsuit Special #1 (1995)

Sirius Entertainment
 Poison Elves #2 (1996)

References

External links
 About Holly G! at Broadsword Comics

 Holly G!'s School Bites & More even manga!

1964 births
20th-century American artists
21st-century American artists
American female comics artists
American comics writers
American female models
Comic book letterers
Comics colorists
Comics inkers
Female comics writers
Living people
Place of birth missing (living people)
Pseudonymous artists
20th-century American women
21st-century American women